2042 is the fourth studio album by English musician Kele Okereke. It was released on 8 November 2019 through Kola Records.

The first single "Jungle Bunny" was released on 4 September 2019.

Critical reception
2042 was met with generally favourable reviews from critics. At Metacritic, which assigns a weighted average rating out of 100 to reviews from mainstream publications, this release received an average score of 72, based on 6 reviews.

Track listing

Personnel
Credits adapted from Discogs.

 Kele Okereke – lead vocals, lead guitar, songwriting
 Gethin Pearson - producer, mixer, engineer
 Ben Jackson - engineer
 Alex Novle - cover
 Alessandro Comotti - graphic design
 Paolo Proserpio - graphic design
 Robin Schmidt - mastering
 Asia Werbel - photography

References

2019 albums
Kele Okereke albums